Verve Coffee Roasters is a coffee roaster based in Santa Cruz, California, founded by Colby Barr and Ryan O'Donovan. Verve opened in November, 2007 in Pleasure Point, California. The company currently operates in twelve California-based locations, four in Santa Cruz, four in Los Angeles, one in San Francisco, one in Manhattan Beach, one in Palo Alto, and one on Meta's Menlo Park campus. They also have four locations in Japan: one at the Shinjuku, Tokyo train station, one in the Roppongi district of Tokyo, one in Kamakura, and a cafe/roastery in the Kanagawa Prefecture. Verve earned the highest score in the coffee category at the Good Food Awards in 2013 and was also named one of the top coffee roasters in the United States by Thrillist, Complex Magazine, and Food Republic  In 2018, they won the Best Espresso at the Coffee Spot Awards, and in 2021 be nominated for the cafe in Japan at the World Latitude Caffe Prize.

References

Companies based in Santa Cruz, California
Coffeehouses and cafés in the United States